Telenor Culture Prize, titled 'Boundless Communication', is given annually to performing artists or organizations that have made an extraordinary contribution within culture in Scandinavia, but who also are established internationally.

The prize was awarded for the first time in 1995 and since then has recognized artists and artistic organizations every year representing multiple disciplines. The prize is awarded to individuals, groups or institutions that have made a significant contribution to culture, across geographical, social and cultural borders. The prize is awarded for innovative performance or communication-related activities at the highest level, within or across artistic forms of expression

Telenor Culture Prize jury

 Martin Eia-Revheim, House Manager, Sparebankstiftelsen DNB, Leader of the Jury
 Lars Saabye Christensen, author
 Ingrid Lorentzen, Artistic Director of the National Ballet
 Alexandra Archetti Stølen, Festival Manager at Oslo World
 Henrik Mestad, actor
 Randi Winnem Due, Telenor Group

Recipients
 1995 – Svein Tindberg, actor
 1996 – Wenche Øyen, artist
 1997 – Kjersti Alveberg, choreographer
 1998 – Kari Bremnes, singer, composer and lyricist
 1999 – Torun Lian, writer and film director
 2000 – Juni Dahr, actress
 2001 – Ingvar Ambjørnsen, writer
 2002 – none, as explained above
 2003 – The World Theatre, Oslo performance group
 2004 – Ingrid Lorentzen, ballet dancer
 2005 – Anne Marit Jacobsen, actress
 2006 – International Child Art Museum
 2007 – Marilyn Mazur, percussionist and composer
 2008 – Jonas Bendiksen, photographer
 2009 – Liv Ullmann, actress and film director
 2010 – Olafur Eliasson, artist
 2011 – Norwegian Radio Orchestra
 2012 – Timbuktu, songwriter and rapper, the first Swedish recipient
 2013 – Hisham Zaman, filmmaker
 2014 – Stian Carstensen, musician
 2015 – Jo Strømgren, dancer, choreographer, theatre and film director
 2016 – Deeyah Khan, filmmaker 
 2017 – Grete Pedersen, choral conductor
 2018 – Vanessa Baird, visual artist
 2019 – Kim Hiorthøy, electronic musician, graphic designer, illustrator, filmmaker and writer
 2020 – Bugge Wesseltoft, jazz musician
 2021 – Marvin Halleraker, cartoonist
 2022 - Girl in Red, artist

References

External links

Norwegian awards
Awards established in 1995